Monét X Change (born February 19, 1990), stage name of Kevin A. Bertin, is an American drag queen, singer, podcaster, and reality television personality. She is known for competing on the tenth season of RuPaul's Drag Race (2018), on which she placed sixth and was selected as that season's Miss Congeniality, and for winning the fourth season of RuPaul's Drag Race All Stars (2018–2019) alongside Trinity the Tuck. She returned to compete in the seventh season of RuPaul's Drag Race All Stars, an all-winners season, where she placed runner-up. Monét X Change released her debut EP, Unapologetically, in 2019. Later that year, she debuted her own web talk show The X Change Rate, on the BUILD Series. She is a staple for many Drag Race-related domestic and international tours, such as Werq the World, A Drag Queen Christmas, and Drive 'N Drag.

She currently co-hosts the Sibling Rivalry podcast, with Bob the Drag Queen, and the Ebony and Irony podcast, with Lady Bunny.

Early life 
Bertin was born in Brooklyn, New York City. At six months old, she moved to Castries, Saint Lucia. and then back to Brooklyn. She later moved to The Bronx as an adult. She trained in opera performance at Westminster Choir College of Rider University.

The first drag pageant Monét X Change won was the sixth annual Gay Caribbean USA Pageant on September 27, 2014, representing Saint Lucia. Her drag sister is RuPaul's Drag Race season 8 winner, Bob The Drag Queen, and her drag mother is Honey Davenport, making her a member of the Davenport drag family.

Career

2018–present: RuPaul's Drag Race 
Monét X Change was announced as one of fourteen contestants competing on the tenth season of RuPaul's Drag Race on February 22, 2018. She was eliminated in episode ten, placing sixth overall. She was named Miss Congeniality during the season's finale, and is the first holder of the title to have been voted by her fellow contestants. During episode one of Drag Race, Monét X Change made a dress decorated with kitchen sponges for the first runway challenge, which became a running joke throughout the rest of the series and inspired a number of Internet memes amongst fans online. Fellow competitor Yuhua Hamasaki created her own sponge dress for sale, and donated the proceeds to Callen-Lorde. A sponge themed pin was available for sale on her website after the episode. The official Twitter of SpongeBob SquarePants also referenced Monét X Change in one of their tweets.

Monét X Change is a co-host of the podcast Sibling Rivalry with her drag sister Bob the Drag Queen. The first episode premiered on March 11, 2018. In June 2018, Monét X Change called out rapper Azealia Banks on Twitter after she threatened to sue RuPaul for plagiarism over the song "Call Me Mother". Banks' account was later deactivated after responding to Monét X Change's tweet. She appeared as a guest in an episode of What Would You Do on July 6, 2018. Monét also toured across the United States and Europe with her one-woman show, "Call Me By Monét."

Monét X Change is the host of the WOWPresents internet series "Monét's Herstory X Change", starting in November 2018. She appeared in a Pepsi commercial with Cardi B in February 2019. On February 15, 2019, she was inducted into the RuPaul's Drag Race All Stars Hall of Fame alongside Trinity the Tuck.
Historically, she became the first black queen in the Hall of Fame. Following her All Stars win, she and Trinity The Tuck were featured guests for the debut episode The Official RuPaul's Drag Race Podcast.
In May, Monet revealed that she would be hosting her own weekly talk show called "The X Change Rate". She was interviewed with Nina West and Adore Delano for an episode of The View in June. Monét X Change and West returned to The View for Meghan McCain's birthday episode.

In June 2019, Monét X Change was one of 37 queens to be featured on the cover of New York magazine.

Monét X Change was one of the Inspirations for Sina Grace's character of Shade, Marvel's first drag queen superhero.

On October 22, 2019, X Change was announced as part of the cast for the first ever season of RuPaul's Celebrity Drag Race, a Drag Race spin-off where Drag Race alumni transform celebrities into Drag Queens, which will premiere in 2020.

In March 2020, amid the coronavirus pandemic, X Change was announced as a featured cast member for the very first Digital Drag Fest!, an online drag festival for all ages, uniting many Drag artists in giving attendees opportunities to interact with the artists, tip them, and win prizes during the online broadcast. She returned the following year for the second annual Digital Drag Fest, in May 2021. In July, X Change was featured in Drive 'N Drag, a drive-in drag show. In December, she co-hosted Thrillist's Virtual Drag Bunch, sponsored by Orbitz.

In Episode 3 of All Stars 5, she made a guest appearance as a "Lip Sync Assassin", where she lip-synced against Jujubee and won.

In January 2021, she launched another podcast, Ebony and Irony, co-hosted by Lady Bunny. She performed at the second annual Black Queer Town Hall in June 2021. In February of 2023, she and Bob The Drag Queen released their own makeup line, "BoMo Beauty", featuring the 8-shade "Pretty/Funny palette. In September 2021, she performed at the Life Is Beautiful Music & Art Festival. She will co-host the 2021 A Drag Queen Christmas event, produced by Murray & Peter.
She was set to voice a character in Made by Maddie, before it was cancelled by Nickelodeon.

In April 2022, Monet X Change was announced as one of the eight returning winners that would be competing in seventh season of RuPaul's Drag Race All Stars, the first ever all-winners season of Drag Race. During the competition, Monét X Change placed in the top two of the first, ninth, and eleventh episodes, winning the first ever spoken word lip sync (a scene from Designing Women)in the ninth episode. After winning the eleventh episode, Monet along with fellow contestant Shea Couleé received 3 "Legendary Legend Stars", which solidified her position in the top 4. She finished the season as a runner-up, ultimately losing the crown to Jinkx Monsoon.

Music 
Bertin is a classically trained opera singer with a bass voice. In school she played roles like Sarastro in The Magic Flute and Colline in La Bohème. Bertin is a collegiate member of the Rho Kappa chapter of the social music fraternity Phi Mu Alpha Sinfonia.

On February 28, 2018, Monét X Change released a cover of Billie Holiday's "Strange Fruit" and an accompanying video to YouTube. She released her first original single, "Soak It Up", on May 25, 2018, the same day as her elimination episode on Drag Race. The official music video features Bob the Drag Queen and fellow season ten and All Stars 4 contestant Monique Heart and has reached over one million views. On February 14, 2019, she revealed a teaser for her debut EP, Unapologetically, as well as the pre-order and lead single "There for You". The full EP and accompanying visual album was released on February 22, 2019.

In June 2021, Monét X Change released "Love Like This", the first single off her upcoming album.

In May 2022, Monét X Change portrayed the voice of Goldie Vandersnatch in Alaska's Drag: The Musical, a studio recording of a planned stage production about two rival drag bars that go head-to-head while struggling through financial troubles.

In February 2023, Monét X Change will star as the Duchess of Krakenthorp in the Minnesota Opera's production of The Daughter of the Regiment.

Filmography

Movies

Television

Theatre

Web series

Discography

EPs

Singles

As lead artist

Featured singles

Music videos

Awards and nominations

See also
 LGBT culture in New York City
 List of LGBT people from New York City

References

External links

 
 
 
 

1990 births
Living people
African-American drag queens
American contemporary R&B singers
American operatic basses
American podcasters
LGBT African Americans
LGBT YouTubers
People from Brooklyn
People from the Bronx
Rider University alumni
RuPaul's Drag Race contestants
RuPaul's Drag Race All Stars winners
Saint Lucian musicians
20th-century LGBT people
21st-century LGBT people